STLC may refer to:

 Simply typed lambda calculus
 Software testing life cycle (disambiguation)
 The St. Louis Cardinals, a professional baseball team based in St. Louis, Missouri
 Space-time line codes